The North Caucasian Emirate ( Severo-Kavkazskiy emirat) was a mainly Avar and Chechen Islamic state that existed in the territory of Chechnya and western Dagestan during the Russian Civil War from September 1919 to March 1920.  The emirate's temporary capital was established in the village of Vedeno and its leader, Uzun Hajji Saltinsky (Узун-Хаджи), was given the title "His Majesty the Imam and the Emir of the North Caucasus Emirate, Sheikh Uzun Khair Haji Khan (Узун Хаир Хаджи Хан)".

In mid-1918, soldiers of the Russian White movement's Volunteer Army under General Anton Denikin began to clash with the North Caucasian peoples of the North Caucasus.  Uzun Haji, with a small detachment of troops, took the village of Vedeno and declared war against Denikin.

In September 1919, Uzun Haji announced the creation of the North Caucasus Emirate as an independent monarchy under the protection of the Ottoman Sultan Mehmed VI.  Ties were established with Kabardian and South Ossetian insurgents and with Georgia, which recognized the emirate's authorities.  However, they failed to remove Volunteer Army troops from the territory of the emirate and became dependent on Bolshevik aid until its suspension.

By January 1920, the military and economic situation in the emirate had begun to deteriorate and Uzun Haji consented to the entry of the emirate into the Russian SFSR with promises of autonomy.  

He soon died but the existence of the state led to the formation of the Mountain Autonomous Soviet Socialist Republic.

See also 

Caucasian Imamate (1828–1859)
Mountainous Republic of the Northern Caucasus (1917–1922)
Caucasus Emirate (2007–present)

References

States and territories established in 1919
States and territories disestablished in 1920
Post–Russian Empire states
Former countries in Europe
History of Chechnya
History of Dagestan
Russian Civil War
1920 disestablishments in Russia
Former emirates
Former monarchies
Former countries of the interwar period